Lynn Ott (born October 20, 1967 in Pittsburgh, Pennsylvania) is an American snowboarder. She has made 16 FIS Snowboard World Championship starts in events including Parallel Giant Slalom, Parallel Slalom, Snowboardcross, and Halfpipe. She has made 167 FIS Snowboard World Cup starts including a snowboardcross podium finish in 1996. She has never qualified for the Olympics but nearly did so in 2006 and 2010.

References

1967 births
American female snowboarders
Living people
21st-century American women